Martin Farach-Colton is an American computer scientist, known for his work in streaming algorithms, suffix tree construction, pattern matching in compressed data, cache-oblivious algorithms, and lowest common ancestor data structures. He is a Distinguished Professor of computer science at Rutgers University, and a co-founder of storage technology startup company Tokutek.

Early life and education 
Farach-Colton is of Argentine descent, and grew up in South Carolina. While attending medical school, he met his future husband, with whom he now has twin children. He obtained his M.D. in 1988 from the Johns Hopkins School of Medicine and his Ph.D. in computer science in 1991 from the University of Maryland, College Park under the supervision of Amihood Amir.

Research contributions 
After completing his Ph.D., he went on to work at Google and co-founded Tokutek. He was program chair of the 14th ACM-SIAM Symposium on Discrete Algorithms (SODA 2003). The cache-oblivious B-tree data structures studied by Bender, Demaine, and Farach-Colton beginning in 2000 became the basis for the fractal tree index used by Tokutek's products TokuDB and TokuMX.

Awards and honors
In 1996, Farach-Colton was awarded an Alfred P. Sloan Research Fellowship.  In 2021, he was inducted as a SIAM Fellow "for contributions to the design and analysis of algorithms and their use in storage systems and computational biology"  and as an  ACM Fellow "for contributions to data structures for biocomputing and big data"  In 2022, he was inducted as an IEEE Fellow "for contributions to data structures for storage systems". In 2012 he won the Simon Imre Test of Time award at LATIN.  In 2016, his paper "Optimizing Every Operation in a Write-optimized File System" won the Best Paper award at FAST.

Personal life 
Farach-Colton is an avid Brazilian jiu-jitsu practitioner and received a bronze medal at the 2015 World Master Jiu-Jitsu IBJJF Championship. He received his black belt from Russell Kerr in 2018. Farach-Colton has served on several charity boards including the Ali Forney Center and Lambda Legal, and is currently on the board of The Trevor Project.

Selected publications
.
.
.
.
. Previously announced in ICALP 2002.
. Previously announced at FOCS 2000.

References

External links
Home page
Google scholar profile

Year of birth missing (living people)
Living people
American people of Argentine descent
American LGBT scientists
American computer scientists
Theoretical computer scientists
University of Maryland, College Park alumni
Rutgers University faculty
LGBT people from South Carolina
LGBT Hispanic and Latino American people
LGBT academics
Argentine computer scientists
Fellows of the Society for Industrial and Applied Mathematics
Fellow Members of the IEEE
Fellows of the Association for Computing Machinery
American practitioners of Brazilian jiu-jitsu
People awarded a black belt in Brazilian jiu-jitsu